Ipimorpha pleonectusa, known generally as the even-lined sallow or blackcheeked aspen caterpillar, is a species of cutworm or dart moth in the family Noctuidae. It is found in North America.

The MONA or Hodges number for Ipimorpha pleonectusa is 9555.

References

Further reading

 
 
 

Xylenini
Articles created by Qbugbot
Moths described in 1873